Naranapuram is a panchayat town in Virudhunagar district in the Indian state of Tamil Nadu.

Demographics
 India census, Naranapuram had a population of 9342. Males constitute 49% of the population and females 51%. Naranapuram has an average literacy rate of 63%, higher than the national average of 59.5%: male literacy is 73%, and female literacy is 55%. In Naranapuram, 13% of the population is under 6 years

References

Cities and towns in Virudhunagar district